Arthur Patrick William Seely, 3rd Baron Mottistone  (18 August 1905 – 4 December 1966), was a family Land Agent on the Isle of Wight and a British Liberal Party politician.

Background
He was the third son of Rt Hon. Jack Seely, who served as a Liberal Cabinet Minister and Emily Florence Crichton. He was educated at Harrow School and Trinity College, Cambridge. He married, in 1939, Wilhelmina Josephine Philippa Van Haeften, eldest daughter of the Dutch Baron Van Haeften. They divorced in 1949. In 1963 he succeeded his elder brother John Seely as Baron Mottistone. In 1966 upon his death he was succeeded by his half-brother David Seely.

Military career
He was commissioned as a Second Lieutenant in the 95th (Hampshire Yeomanry) Field Brigade, Royal Artillery, of the Territorial Army (TA) on 26 June 1931, then Lieutenant in the 57th (Wessex) Heavy Anti-Aircraft Regiment, Royal Artillery on 27 June 1934. He was re-commissioned as a Lieutenant on 1 May 1939, just before the outbreak of World War II. In 1940 he was promoted to Captain. In 1942 he was promoted to Major. After the war, he was promoted to Lieutenant-Colonel in the TA and given command of the former 57th (Wessex) when it was reformed as the 457th Heavy Anti-Aircraft Regiment.

Political career
In 1934 he followed his father into politics on the Isle of Wight when he was elected as a County Councillor for the Freshwater Division. He served on the Isle of Wight County Council until resigning in May 1938. Around 1937 he was selected by the Isle of Wight Liberals to be their prospective parliamentary candidate, but by 1939 had been replaced by Helen de Guerry Browne. After the war he was Liberal candidate for the Nottingham East Division at the 1945 General Election. This was a former Liberal seat that was lost in 1931 and where the Liberals had come third in 1935. Although he finished third he was able to increase the Liberal vote share;

References

1905 births
1966 deaths
Liberal Party (UK) hereditary peers
Barons in the Peerage of the United Kingdom
Alumni of Trinity College, Cambridge
Deputy Lieutenants of the Isle of Wight
People educated at Harrow School
Councillors in the Isle of Wight
Patrick
Hampshire Yeomanry officers
Liberal Party (UK) parliamentary candidates
British Army personnel of World War II
Royal Artillery officers